John Ward (dates unknown) was an English professional cricketer who made 14 known appearances in first-class cricket matches between 1800 and 1806. He played most frequently for England XIs and regularly appeared at Lord's. He was considered one of the leading bowlers of the day and made an appearance for a Kent XI in 1806.

References

English cricketers
English cricketers of 1787 to 1825
Kent cricketers
Year of birth unknown
Year of death unknown